Kaian (Kayan) is a Ramu language of Kaian village in Yawar Rural LLG, Madang Province, Papua New Guinea.

References

Ottilien languages
Languages of Madang Province